Blue Gardenia may refer to:

The Blue Gardenia, a 1953 film
Blue Gardenia (song), a song for the film above, written by Bob Russell and Lester Lee, which became a jazz standard, performed by Nat King Cole, Dinah Washington, and others
Blue Gardenia (album), a 2001 album by Etta James

See also 
Gardenia
Gardenia (disambiguation)